The Sobradinho Dam is a large hydroelectric dam built on the São Francisco River in Sobradinho, in the state of Bahia of Brazil.

See also 

 List of hydroelectric power stations in Brazil
 List of conventional hydroelectric power stations

References 

Dams completed in 1982
Energy infrastructure completed in 1982
Dams in Bahia
Hydroelectric power stations in Brazil
Dams on the São Francisco River
1982 establishments in Brazil